Sobetinci is a settlement in the Municipality of Markovci in northeastern Slovenia. Its earliest known mention in written documents comes from an urbarium of the Archbishopric of Salzburg dating to 1322. The area is part of the traditional region of Styria. It is now included with the rest of the municipality in the Drava Statistical Region.

References

External links
Sobetinci on Geopedia

Populated places in the Municipality of Markovci